Affluent (foaled 1998 in Kentucky) is an American Thoroughbred racehorse.

Background
Affluent is a bay mare bred in Kentucky by her owner Janis Whitham. She was trained by U.S. Racing Hall of Fame inductee Ron McAnally.

Racing career
The daughter of 1978 U.S. Triple Crown winner Affirmed won four Grade I races and retired to broodmare duty with career earnings of $1,497,650.

Breeding record
As a broodmare, Affluent has produced two foals by Storm Cat, one by Distorted Humor and a foal by Awesome Again is due in 2009.

References
 Affluent's pedigree and partial racing stats

1998 racehorse births
Thoroughbred family 9-g
Racehorses bred in Kentucky
Racehorses trained in the United States